Kullman, or Kulman, is a surname. Notable people with the surname include:

Arnie Kullman (1927–1999), Canadian ice hockey player
Charles Kullman (1903–1983), American opera singer
Ed Kullman (1923–1997), Canadian ice hockey player
Elisabeth Kulman (born 1973), classical singer
Ellen J. Kullman (born 1956), American chief executive
Leen Kullman (1910–1943), Soviet military intelligence agent

See also
Cullman (disambiguation)
Kullmann, a surname